The leopard eel (Myrichthys pardalis) is an eel in the worm or snake eels family, Ophichthidae. It was described by Achille Valenciennes in 1839, originally under the genus Ophisurus.

It is of minor commercial interest to fisheries.

It is a marine, tropical eel, which is known from the eastern Atlantic Ocean, including the Canary Islands; Annobón Island, Equatorial Guinea, and São Tomé Island. It forms burrows in coarse sand sediments on rocky island coasts. The species is also found in the western Atlantic Ocean.

The leopard eel's diet consists of benthic invertebrates.

References

External links
 

leopard eel
Fish of the East Atlantic
Fauna of the Canary Islands
Fish of Equatorial Guinea
Fauna of Annobón
Fauna of São Tomé Island
Marine fauna of West Africa
leopard eel